Aaron Mattia Tabacchi (born 26 June 1998) is an Italian football player.

Club career
He made his professional debut in the Serie A for Bologna on 15 May 2016 as an 83rd-minute substitute for Emanuele Giaccherini in a game against Chievo.

On 31 January 2019, he was loaned to Imolese.

References

External links
 

1998 births
Footballers from Bologna
Living people
Italian footballers
Bologna F.C. 1909 players
Ravenna F.C. players
Imolese Calcio 1919 players
Serie A players
Serie C players
Association football forwards